Răducanu is a Romanian surname and occasional given name:

 Claudiu Răducanu (born 1976), Romanian football player
 Cristian Raducanu (born 1967), Romanian and English rugby union player
 Dumitru Răducanu (born 1967),  Romanian cox
 Emanoil Răducanu (1929–1991), Romanian basketball player
 Emma Raducanu (born 2002), British tennis player
 Johnny Răducanu (1931–2011), Romanian jazz pianist of Romani descent
 Marcel Răducanu (born 1954), Romanian football player
 Maria Răducanu (born 1967), Romanian jazz songwriter and singer
 Răducanu Necula (born 1946), Romanian football player

See also 
 Răducan (surname)
 Radu (given name)
 Radu (surname)
 Rădulescu (surname)
 Rădeni (disambiguation)
 Rădești (disambiguation)
 Răduțești (disambiguation)
 Rădulești (disambiguation)

Romanian-language surnames